Heather Christine Sears (28 September 1935 – 3 January 1994) was a British stage and screen actress.

Early life
Sears was the daughter of distinguished London doctor William Gordon Sears by his marriage to Eileen Gould. 

Although not from an acting family, she was already performing in plays at the age of five, and even writing them at the age of eight. Sears had a long association with France and French culture, which began in her childhood when she spent summers in Brittany with her pen pal Michelle where she learned to speak French fluently. After leaving school, she spent time in Paris performing voiceover and dubbing work and socialising with artists and writers such as Pablo Picasso, Albert Camus and Arthur Koestler.

Sears was educated at St Winifred's School, Llanfairfechan until she was 16, when she followed her elder sister Ann Sears (1933–1992) to the Central School of Speech and Drama in London. During her last year there, she signed a seven-year contract with Romulus Films, which allowed her six months per year to act on the stage and for television if she wished. This was made possible through film director Jack Clayton, her friend and mentor.

Early career
After graduating from drama school, Sears was active from 1955 onward in the Windsor repertory theatre. She made her film début with a minor role in Michael Truman's Touch and Go (1955) followed by a part in Maurice Elvey's film version of comedy Dry Rot (1956) as the naive Susan.

Sears débuted on the London stage before the age of 22, replacing Mary Ure in the part of Alison in John Osborne's Look Back in Anger, playing alongside Richard Bates and Richard Pasco. Shortly thereafter, she played Claire Bloom's role in the television production of Ring Round the Moon. 

Her title role in David Miller's film The Story of Esther Costello (1957) marked her breakthrough in films and brought her international acclaim. In the film, Sears plays a blind, deaf and mute girl of 15 who is adopted by a rich American society lady played by Joan Crawford, who also chose Sears for the part. After completing her work on The Story of Esther Costello, Sears married Tony Masters, one of the two art directors of the film. A year later she was nominated for the Golden Globe award and also received the British Film Academy award for best British actress of the year in recognition for her role as Esther Costello. After this initial success, she alternated between film and theatre roles until the mid-1960s.

In London, Sears appeared at the Royal Court Theatre with Alan Bates and Richard Pearce in Jean Giraudoux's The Apollo of Bellac under the direction of John Dexter, in Michael Hastings' Yes and at the Lyric Theatre, Hammersmith in Julien Green's play South. On screen, she was cast in Room at the Top (1959) as Susan Brown, the naive daughter of an industrial magnate (Donald Wolfit) who falls for social climber Joe Lampton (Laurence Harvey). Sears had a lifelong friendship with Simone Signoret, who stars as her married rival for Joe Lampton's affections.

Sears travelled to Australia to appear in the last Ealing Studios film, The Siege of Pinchgut (1959), in which she played a hostage who forms a romantic liaison with an escaped convict. The film later became a classic of Australian cinema.

One year later, in the film adaptation of Lawrence's semi-autobiographical novel Sons and Lovers (1960) directed by Jack Cardiff, she appeared as Miriam, the girlfriend and intellectual companion of Paul Morel (Dean Stockwell).

In Hammer's production of The Phantom of the Opera (1962), Sears played the opera singer Christine Charles. Her singing voice was dubbed by opera performer Pat Clark. 

She appeared in The Black Torment (1964) as Lady Elizabeth, her last feature-film role for many years.

Later life and career
Sears reduced her work commitments to raise her three sons, but she continued to appear on television in many BBC and ITV dramas until 1981. She also appeared as Grusha in Brecht's The Caucasian Chalk Circle at the Chichester Festival Theatre in 1969 and in Alan Ayckbourn's comedy How the Other Half Loves in London's West End.

In the 1970s, Sears returned to provincial repertory theatre. She was based at the Haymarket Theatre in Leicester, where she played title roles in classical plays by Sophocles (Antigone and Elektra), Shakespeare, Goldsmith, Dostoyevsky, Ibsen (Hedda Gabler) and Strindberg (Miss Julie), as well as in the work of more modern playwrights such as Liane Aukin (Little Lamb), Brecht (The Caucasian Chalk Circle), Ayckbourn (How the Other Half Loves), Rattigan and Pinter. She also toured with the One-Woman-Show playing Virginia Woolf. She later appeared in a television film adaptation of Dickens' semi-autobiographical novel Great Expectations (1974) as Biddy. In 1989, she made her final screen appearance in The Last Day of School, in which she played a working mother and entrepreneur.
 
In the last ten years of her life, Sears travelled extensively, spending many months in Mexico, China, Italy, North Africa and Egypt. Her husband Tony Masters died in May 1990 while on holiday with her in the south of France, where the couple would visit every year during the Cannes Film Festival. She did not remarry.

Sears died at the age of 58 in early 1994 of multiple organ failure caused by cancer at the family home in Hinchley Wood near Esher, Surrey. Her son Adam Masters became a film and television editor while his brothers Giles and Dominic became feature-film art directors.

Filmography

Film

Television

Awards and nominations

Bibliography

	cf. Obituary Heather Sears. In: The Times, 27 January 1994, Features
	cf. Robin Midgely: An early coming of age. In: Manchester Guardian Weekly, 30 January 1994, p. 10
	cf. Adam Benedick: Obituary: Heather Sears. In: The Independent, 19 January 1994, p. 14
	cf. Biography from Allmovie
	Internet Movie Database

References

External links
 
 Biography from Allmovie at movies.nytimes.com
 Photoportraits of Heather Sears  in The National Portrait Gallery

1935 births
1994 deaths
English film actresses
Best British Actress BAFTA Award winners
20th-century English actresses
English stage actresses
People from Kensington
Actresses from London
Alumni of the Royal Central School of Speech and Drama
People educated at St Winifred's School